Club Deportivo Mallén is a Spanish football team based in Mallén, in the autonomous community of Aragón. Founded in 1955, it plays in Regional Preferente, holding home games at San Sebastián, with a 1,500-seat capacity.

Season to season

11 seasons in Tercera División

External links
Official website
futbolaragon.com profile 
Facebook profile

Football clubs in Aragon
Association football clubs established in 1955
Divisiones Regionales de Fútbol clubs
1955 establishments in Spain